Love Weaves Through a Millennium (Chinese: 相爱穿梭千年) is a 2015 Chinese television series starring Jing Boran and Zheng Shuang. It is a remake of the 2012 South Korean television series Queen and I. The series aired on Hunan TV from 15 February to 23 March 2015.

Synopsis
Gong Ming (Jing Boran) is an imperial scholar official and his family's sole survivor after they were massacred in a conspiracy. He is an avid supporter of the reinstatement of Empress Xu, who was deposed due to scheming by royal concubine Zhao Feiyan.

While he was being persecuted, he accidentally time-travels two thousand years into the present due to a mysterious jade pendant. He meets and falls in love with actress Lin Xiangxiang (Zheng Shuang), who landed a role as Empress Xu in a historical drama.

However, for the greater good, Gong Ming was insistent on heading back into the past to save the deposed empress. He finds out that he could not return to the present where Xiang Xiang is. Will they forever be apart, or will they reunite through the power of love?

Cast

Main
Jing Boran as Gong Ming 
Zheng Shuang as Lin Xiangxiang

Supporting

Present
Evonne Hsieh as Jin Jing, Xiang Xiang's manager
Yang Sen as Xia Yunan, Xiang Xiang's stylist 
Denny Huang as Han Yufei, a famous celebrity and Xiang Xiang's ex-boyfriend 
Nana as Zhao Nana, a famous and arrogant celebrity
Xie Binbin as Wu Tianxiu, Yu Fei's manager
Li Gan as Chen Rui, Na Na's manager

Past
Chen Xiang as Wang Mang, Gong Ming's good friend who later betrays him. He likes Jing Yue. 
Zhou Yutong as Jing Yue, a female warrior. She likes Gong Ming.
Peng Ling as Zi Xiu, Wang Mang's confidante; a cold-blooded assassin
Niki Yi as Zhao Feiyan 
Gao Taiyu as Emperor Cheng 
Tao Hui as Empress Xu
Zhou Yunshen as Chunyu Zhang

Production
The series is co-produced by Hunan TV and CJ E&M. It is helmed  by director Jang Young-woo of I Need Romance 3, producer Kim Young-gyu of Flower Boys Next Door and Nine: Nine Time Travels and the lightning director of My Love From the Star. The music, editing and artistic direction of the series was also done by the Korean production team of Queen and I.

Unlike other typical Chinese television series, Love Weaves Through a Millennium was not pre-produced before its premiere. It was filmed based on a live-shooting format. The script was amended based on audience's responses, including the drama's ending. No dubbing was used; instead, the actors' actual voices were heard in the drama.

Actual Chinese history was adapted into the new script, such as the rivalry between Zhao Feiyan and Empress Xu.

Soundtrack

Ratings 

 Highest ratings are marked in red, lowest ratings are marked in blue

See also

 Han dynasty

References

External links

Chinese romantic fantasy television series
Chinese time travel television series
Hunan Television dramas
Alternate history television series
2015 Chinese television series debuts
Television series by CJ E&M
Chinese television series based on South Korean television series